Corazon: Ang Unang Aswang, or simply Corazon, is a 2012 Filipino psychological thriller film starring Erich Gonzales and Derek Ramsay.  It is the second film produced by Skylight Films, and released by Star Cinema.

Plot
In the 1950s, Corazon, a woman rumored to have been a prostitute during the Second World War, struggles to conceive a child with her devoted husband Daniel while being shunned by neighbors in the village of Magdalena. She becomes pregnant after following advice from a faith healer but gives birth to a stillborn baby, shattering her religious faith, driving her insane and setting her off on a vicious killing spree of village children at night, starting with her devouring the unburied remains of her child. She vanishes into the forest to Daniel's anguish and becomes feral, developing enhanced physical abilities.

After Corazon is identified and wounded by one of the villagers after a failed attack, they confront Daniel and demand that he find Corazon. Daniel refuses to believe his wife's involvement, admitting to his friend Naldo that he once saw their abusive landlord Matias and his henchmen on their way to kill a fellow villager in a similar manner. Corazon later attacks Nene, a girl who had befriended her, but lets her go when the latter reminds her of her past. Recovering part of her humanity, she despairs of her state and that of Daniel, whom she discreetly approaches at times. 

As the villagers prepare to rise against Matias, Corazon, attracted by the crying sounds of Matias' daughter Lisa, breaks into his house and kills her. Distraught, Matias shoots Corazon as she escapes and runs into the village carrying her dead child, convincing everyone of Corazon's culpability. Matias, his men and the villagers accost Daniel and burn down his house. In retaliation, Daniel kills Matias before fleeing his men, while a wounded Corazon is spotted by the villagers and also flees. The couple run into each other in the forest. Corazon tells Daniel to leave, citing her condition, but Daniel professes her continued love, sharing a kiss before she flees. Naldo confronts Daniel for his refusal to capture Corazon, but lets him go to reunite with her as they escape into the woods. Naldo narrates that both Corazon, now referred to as an aswang, and Daniel were never seen again, but are believed to be lurking around, while lamenting how they were forced into their predicament by the inhumanity of the times.

Cast and characters

Main cast
Erich Gonzales as Corazon
Derek Ramsay as Daniel
Tetchie Agbayani as Melinda
Mark Gil† as Matias
Epi Quizon as Naldo

Supporting role
Mon Confiado as Berto
Maria Isabel Lopez as Herminia
Sue Prado as Concha
Dan Alvaro as Romulo
Sharlene San Pedro as Nene
Bodjie Pascua as Maning
Hermie Concepcion as Maya
Laiza Comia as Liza

Overview
Early production began in May 2011. The director, Richard Somes revealed that the idea of the concept was created in 2008 after he finished his first horror full-length script, Yanggaw, a story that dwells on the aswang myth and the culture that surrounds the legend. The trailer simultaneously premiered in the premiere of the ABS-CBN Sunday night variety show, Sarah G. Live, in television and in the official YouTube account of Star Cinema online. The poster was also released the same time via Star Cinema's Twitter account.

Release
The film was in direct competition with the GMA Films' My Kontrabida Girl which was also released on the same date.

Reception
The film was graded "B" by the Cinema Evaluation Board. The film received R-13 rating from the MTRCB. On the review of Philippine Entertainment Portal; they praised the visuals, while the common complaint from the film is that the storytelling is a bit messy. PEP also pointed out there are too many side stories in the film, that they should have been focused on the title character.

The film is one of the 20 Top Grossing Filipino Films of 2012. It is the most successful independent film of 2012 when it comes to box office performance.

See also
 List of ghost films

References

External links

2012 films
2012 psychological thriller films
Jiangshi films
Philippine thriller drama films
Philippine romantic horror films
Philippine psychological thriller films
Star Cinema films
Skylight Films films
Reality Entertainment films
Films set in the 1940s
Films set in the Philippines
Films set on the home front during World War II
Films based on Asian myths and legends